Sam Baroudi (born Sammy Crandall, August 29, 1926 – February 21, 1948) was a professional American boxer in the middleweight division.

Boxing career 
Baroudi fought his first professional fight on May 15, 1945 in the Meadowbrook Bowl in Newark, New Jersey, winning against Jimmy Picollo by knockout in the first round. Over the next two years his record was 35 wins, 7 losses, and two draws. On August 15, 1947, in his 44th fight, Baroudi fought Newton Smith, knocking Smith out in the ninth round. Smith never regained consciousness and later died in the hospital. Baroudi lost his next fight on points, but started another winning streak. Until his last fight, Baroudi never went down in 52 fights.

Death 
On February 20, 1948, Baroudi fought in Chicago against future world heavyweight champion Ezzard Charles. In the tenth round, Charles knocked out Baroudi, and like his fight with Newton Smith six months earlier, Baroudi never regained consciousness, succumbing to a brain hemorrhage at the hospital a few hours later. Charles was so shaken by the young fighter’s death that he considered ending his boxing career, but Baroudi's family convinced Charles to continue fighting.

Professional boxing record

References

External links
 Sam Baroudi

1926 births
1948 deaths
Boxers from Ohio
Heavyweight boxers
American male boxers
African-American boxers
Sportspeople from Akron, Ohio
20th-century African-American sportspeople